This is about a physician from Nevada, for the bishop from Florida see Robert Nugent Lynch.

Robert Clyde Lynch (1880 - 1931) was a physician from the United States.

Biography
Lynch was born in Carson City, Nevada.

Career
He made important contributions related to otolaryngology, a special field of medicine that deals with the ears, nose and throat. He improved on the surgical procedure known as the Lynch operation, a frontal sinus operation. He was the first to film motion pictures of the larynx and the vocal cords.

References

1880 births
1931 deaths
American otolaryngologists
Physicians from Nevada
20th-century surgeons